Bill Rogers was a college football, baseball, and basketball player for the South Carolina Gamecocks of the University of South Carolina.

Gamecocks
Rogers earned nine varsity letters in his time at South Carolina.

Football
On Branch Bocock's football teams, he was quarterback and punter.  Once against rival Clemson Rogers picked up his own punt, which had bounced off a Clemson player, and ran seventeen yards for a 10 to 0 lead in what would be a 33 to 0 victory. Rogers was selected All-Southern in 1926.  In Rogers three years leading the football team it went 20–10.

Basketball
The basketball team went 33–16 while Rogers was on the team. He scored 345 points in 47 career games.

Rogers was elected to the South Carolina Athletics Hall of Fame in 1969.

References

American football quarterbacks
South Carolina Gamecocks football players
South Carolina Gamecocks men's basketball players
South Carolina Gamecocks baseball players
All-Southern college football players
American football punters
Year of birth missing
Year of death missing
American men's basketball players